A news agency is an organization that gathers news reports and sells them to subscribing news organizations, such as newspapers, magazines and radio and television broadcasters. A news agency may also be referred to as a wire service, newswire, or news service.

Although there are many news agencies around the world, three global news agencies, Agence France-Presse (AFP), the Associated Press (AP), and Reuters have offices in most countries of the world, cover all areas of information, and provide the majority of international news printed by the world's newspapers. All three began with and continue to operate on a basic philosophy of providing a single objective news feed to all subscribers. Jonathan Fenby explains the philosophy:

To achieve such wide acceptability, the agencies avoid overt partiality. Demonstrably correct information is their stock in trade. Traditionally, they report at a reduced level of responsibility, attributing their information to a spokesman, the press, or other sources. They avoid making judgments and steer clear of doubt and ambiguity. Though their founders did not use the word, objectivity is the philosophical basis for their enterprises – or failing that, widely acceptable neutrality.

Newspaper syndicates generally sell their material to one client in each territory only, while news agencies distribute news articles to all interested parties.

History
Only a few large newspapers could afford bureaus outside their home city; they relied instead on news agencies, especially Havas (founded 1835) in France—now known as Agence France-Presse (AFP)—and the Associated Press (founded 1846) in the United States. Former Havas employees founded Reuters in 1851 in Britain and Wolff in 1849 in Germany. For international news, the agencies pooled their resources, so that Havas, for example, covered the French Empire, South America and the Balkans and shared the news with the other national agencies. In France the typical contract with Havas provided a provincial newspaper with 1800 lines of telegraphed text daily, for an annual subscription rate of 10,000 francs. Other agencies provided features and fiction for their subscribers.

In the 1830s, France had several specialized agencies. Agence Havas was founded in 1835 by a Parisian translator and advertising agent, Charles-Louis Havas, to supply news about France to foreign customers. In the 1840s, Havas gradually incorporated other French agencies into his agency. Agence Havas evolved into Agence France-Presse (AFP). Two of his employees, Bernhard Wolff and Paul Julius Reuter, later set up rival news agencies, Wolffs Telegraphisches Bureau in 1849 in Berlin and Reuters in 1851 in London. Guglielmo Stefani founded the Agenzia Stefani, which became the most important press agency in Italy from the mid-19th century to World War II, in Turin in 1853.

The development of the telegraph in the 1850s led to the creation of strong national agencies in England, Germany, Austria and the United States. But despite the efforts of governments, through telegraph laws such as in 1878 in France, inspired by the British Telegraph Act of 1869 which paved the way for the nationalisation of telegraph companies and their operations, the cost of telegraphy remained high.

In the United States, the judgment in Inter Ocean Publishing v. Associated Press facilitated competition by requiring agencies to accept all newspapers wishing to join. As a result of the increasing newspapers, the Associated Press was now challenged by the creation of United Press Associations in 1907 and International News Service by newspaper publisher William Randolph Hearst in 1909.

Driven by the huge U.S. domestic market, boosted by the runaway success of radio, all three major agencies required the dismantling of the "cartel agencies" through the Agreement of 26 August 1927. They were concerned about the success of U.S. agencies from other European countries which sought to create national agencies after the First World War. Reuters had been weakened by war censorship, which promoted the creation of newspaper cooperatives in the Commonwealth and national agencies in Asia, two of its strong areas.

After the Second World War, the movement for the creation of national agencies accelerated, when accessing the independence of former colonies, the national agencies were operated by the state. Reuters, became cooperative, managed a breakthrough in finance, and helped to reduce the number of U.S. agencies from three to one, along with the internationalization of the Spanish EFE and the globalization of Agence France-Presse.

The German Press Agency (dpa) in Germany was founded as a co-operative in Goslar on 18 August 1949 and became a limited liability company in 1951. Fritz Sänger was the first editor-in-chief. He served as managing director until 1955 and as managing editor until 1959. The first transmission occurred at 6 a.m. on 1 September 1949.

In 1924, Benito Mussolini placed Agenzia Stefani under the direction of Manlio Morgagni, who expanded the agency's reach significantly both within Italy and abroad. Agenzia Stefani was dissolved in 1945, and its technical structure and organization were transferred to the new Agenzia Nazionale Stampa Associata (ANSA). Wolffs was taken over by the Nazi regime in 1934, and Reuters continues to operate as a major international news agency today. In 1865, Reuter and Wolff signed agreements with Havas's sons, forming a cartel designating exclusive reporting zones for each of their agencies within Europe.

Since the 1960s, the major agencies were provided with new opportunities in television and magazine, and news agencies delivered specialized production of images and photos, the demand for which is constantly increasing. In France, for example, they account for over two-thirds of national market.

By the 1980s, the four main news agencies, AFP, AP, UPI and Reuters, provided over 90% of foreign news printed by newspapers around the world.

Commercial services
News agencies can be corporations that sell news (e.g., PA Media, Thomson Reuters, dpa and United Press International). Other agencies work cooperatively with large media companies, generating their news centrally and sharing local news stories the major news agencies may choose to pick up and redistribute (e.g., Associated Press (AP), Agence France-Presse (AFP) or the Indian news agency PTI).

Governments may also control news agencies: China (Xinhua), Russia (TASS), and several other countries have government-funded news agencies which also use information from other agencies as well.

Commercial newswire services charge businesses to distribute their news (e.g., Business Wire,  GlobeNewswire, PR Newswire, PR Web, and Cision).

The major news agencies generally prepare hard news stories and feature articles that can be used by other news organizations with little or no modification, and then sell them to other news organizations. They provide these articles in bulk electronically through wire services (originally they used telegraphy; today they frequently use the Internet). Corporations, individuals, analysts, and intelligence agencies may also subscribe.

News sources, collectively, described as alternative media provide reporting which emphasizes a self-defined "non-corporate view" as a contrast to the points of view expressed in corporate media and government-generated news releases. Internet-based alternative news agencies form one component of these sources.

Associations
There are several different associations of news agencies. EANA is the European Alliance of Press Agencies, while the OANA is an association of news agencies of the Asia-Pacific region. MINDS is a global network of leading news agencies collaborating in new media business.

List of major news agencies

List of commercial newswire services 

 Asian News International
 Black PR Wire
 Business Wire
 Cision
 CNW Group
 GlobeNewswire
 Hispanic PR Wire
 Korea Newswire
 News By Wire
 PR Newswire
 PR Web
 Press Trust of India
 TASS
 Xinhua News Agency

See also

List of news agencies
List of wire services
Press release distribution

References

Further reading 
 Fenby, Jonathan. The International News Services (1986) 
 Gramling, Oliver. AP: The Story of News (1940)  
 Kenny, Peter. "News agencies as content providers and purveyors of news: A mediahistoriographical study on the development and diversity of wire services" (MPhil Diss. University of Stellenbosch, 2009) online, with a detailed bibliography pp. 171–200
 Morris, Joel Alex. The Deadline Every Minute: The Story of the United Press (1957) 
 Paterson, Chris A., and Annabelle Sreberny, eds. International news in the 21st Century (University of Luton Press, 2004) 
 Putnis, P. "Reuters in Australia: the supply and exchange of news, 1859–1877" Media History (2004). 10#2 pp: 67–88.
 Read, D. The power of news: the history of Reuters (Oxford UP, 1992). 
 Schwarzlose, Richard Allen. The American wire services: a study of their development as a social institution (1979) 
 Stephens, M. A history of news (3rd ed. Oxford UP, 2007). 
 Sterling, C. H. "News agencies" in Encyclopedia of international media and communications (2003) 3: 235–246.
 Storey, Graham. Reuter's Century (1951) 
 Xin, X. "A developing market in news: Xinhua News Agency and Chinese newspapers" Media, Culture & Society (2006) 28#1 pp: 45–66.

External links 
 

 
Print syndication
Journalism